Freeman Coliseum is a sports and concert venue located in San Antonio, Texas. It has been host to thousands of events including the San Antonio Stock Show & Rodeo, concerts, trade shows, motor sports, circus, professional sports including professional bull riding, basketball, hockey, boxing and wrestling. It was the largest indoor arena in San Antonio until HemisFair Arena opened in 1968. Since then, many top recording artists have made their San Antonio concert debuts at the Coliseum.

Freeman Coliseum was the home of the San Antonio Stock Show & Rodeo until the opening in 2003 of the adjacent AT&T Center, formerly known as SBC Center. Although the main rodeo event is now in AT&T Center, stock show and exhibit aspects of the rodeo are still held in the Coliseum. The 2021 Rodeo was held in the Freeman due to the COVID-19 Pandemic. The WNBA's San Antonio Stars played its home games at Freeman Coliseum during the 2015 season due to renovations at AT&T Center. The Coliseum was home to the San Antonio Rowels and its national team rodeo league competition, as well as two professional hockey teams: the Central Hockey League San Antonio Iguanas and later, the International Hockey League San Antonio Dragons from 1996 to 1998.

On February 26, 1983, the Freeman Coliseum hosted the rematch boxing contest between International Boxing Hall of Fame member Alexis Arguello and Vilomar Fernandez, won by Arguello by ten rounds unanimous decision.

Freeman Coliseum seats 9,500 for motor sports, rodeos and professional bull riding; 9,800 for basketball and up to 11,700 for concerts, boxing and wrestling. It contains a  ceiling height. When used for trade shows, the arena features  of space, plus  of exhibit space in four adjacent exhibit halls—the  Morris Center, the  Exhibit Hall #1, the  Freeman Building and the  Exhibit Hall #2.

References

External links

San Antonio Stock Show And Rodeo History
World Class Memories: VIRTUAL WCCW TOUR

Convention centers in Texas
Indoor arenas in Texas
Indoor ice hockey venues in the United States
Sports venues in San Antonio